The 2019–20 season was West Bromwich Albion's second consecutive season in the Championship since 2017–18 and their 142nd year in existence. This season, the club participated in the Championship, the FA Cup and the League Cup. The season covered the period from 1 July 2019 to 22 July 2020.

Albion finished as runners-up in the Championship, thus gaining automatic promotion to the Premier League. They became the first club to achieve a fifth Premier League promotion.

Pre-season

Competitions

Championship

League table

Results summary

Results by matchday

Matches
On Thursday, 20 June 2019, the EFL Championship fixtures were revealed.

FA Cup 

The third round draw was made live on BBC Two from Etihad Stadium, Micah Richards and Tony Adams conducted the draw. The fourth round draw was made by Alex Scott and David O'Leary on Monday, 6 January. The draw for the fifth round was made on 27 January 2020, live on The One Show.

EFL Cup

The first round draw was made on 20 June.

Transfers

Transfers in

Loans in

Loans out

Transfers out

Appearances & Goals

|-
!colspan=14|Players out on loan:

|}

Goals record

Disciplinary record

References

West Bromwich Albion
West Bromwich Albion F.C. seasons